Per Sempre (English: Forever) may refer to:

 "Per Sempre", a single by Bloom 06 from their album Crash Test 01
 "Per sempre" (Marco Carta song), 2008, from Amici's compilation Ti brucia
 "Per sempre" (Nina Zilli song), 2012
 "Per Sempre (for Always)", a song by Anthony Callea 
 "Per Sempre Amore", a song by Lolly 
 Forever (2003 film) or Per sempre, a film starring Francesca Neri